Brachychiton paradoxus, commonly known as the red-flowered kurrajong, is a small tree of the genus Brachychiton found in northern Australia. It was originally classified in the family Sterculiaceae, which is now within Malvaceae.

Notes

References

paradoxus
Flora of Queensland
Malvales of Australia
Trees of Australia
Ornamental trees
Drought-tolerant trees